Alicia Maxine Wilson (born 19 December 1979) is a Jamaican former footballer who played as a defender. She is the head coach at Navarro College in Corsicana, Texas.

Honours 
KR
Winner
 Selected twice in the best 11
 League Cup Women C:2007
 W-League Champion NJ Wildcats 2005
 W-League player of the week Twice in 2004
 All Region/All GCAC Conference First Team- Region 13 NAIA [2004,2003,2002,2000]
 Player of the Year Region 13/ GCAC Conference NAIA 2001
 All American NAIA 2001, Honorable Mention- 2000, 2002, 2003!

External links 
 
http://goargos.com/coaches.aspx?path=wsoc&rc=38
http://Navarrocollege.edu/Athletics/Soccer/staff

1979 births
Living people
Jamaican women's footballers
Women's association football defenders
Jamaica women's international footballers
Alicia Wilson
Alicia Wilson
Jamaican expatriate women's footballers
Jamaican expatriate sportspeople in the United States
Expatriate women's soccer players in the United States
Jamaican expatriate sportspeople in Iceland
Expatriate women's footballers in Iceland